Sphaenorhynchus dorisae, the Doris' lime treefrog, is a species of frog in the family Hylidae. It is found in the upper Amazon Basin of southeastern Colombia (Amazonas Department), Ecuador, Brazil and Peru. It might also be present in Bolivia.

Etymology
The specific name dorisae honors Doris Mable Cochran, an American herpetologist.

Description
Adult males measure  and females  in snout–vent length. The snout is rounded in dorsal view. The tympanum is small and indistinct. The fingers are one-third webbed whereas the toes are fully webbed. The dorsum is bright green with small dark spots or lavender green with small spots that are white to yellow. The venter is white. The iris is bronze.

Habitat and conservation
They are commonly found amidst floating vegetation, in particular water lettuce (Pistia). It can locally be threatened by habitat loss.

References

dorisae
Amphibians of Brazil
Amphibians of Colombia
Amphibians of Ecuador
Amphibians of Peru
Amphibians described in 1957
Taxonomy articles created by Polbot